A Woman Peeling Apples (c. 1663) is a painting by the Dutch Golden Age painter Pieter de Hooch in the Wallace Collection in London.

Description
It is a genre painting showing a quiet domestic scene from the time, like most of de Hooch's works.  The elaborate fireplace and fur and embroidery in the mother's clothes show a prosperous household, and the cupid between the two figures implies a happy one.  Its sensitive handling of light—in particular, natural light filtered into an otherwise unlit interior space—led 19th-century art historians to attribute it to Johannes Vermeer, with whose work the painting does bear strong similarities.  However, Vermeer's work typically portrayed a woman working alone instead of a family scene as in A Woman Peeling Apples.  Most scholars also now believe that de Hooch was influenced by Vermeer instead of Vermeer by de Hooch.

The painting is in oil on canvas (67 cm × 55 cm). It is also sometimes referred to as A Woman Peeling Apples, with a Small Child. This painting was documented by Hofstede de Groot in 1908, who wrote:33. WOMAN PEELING APPLES. de G. 55. In the right-hand corner of a room sits a woman, facing the spectator. She wears a black velvet jacket trimmed with fur, a red skirt, and a white apron. In her lap she holds a basket of apples which she is peeling. She holds out a long rind in her right hand to a little girl standing to the left and seen in profile. A tub is on the floor at the woman's feet. To the left is a fireplace with a kettle on the fire. The fireplace is lined with Delft tiles, and is enclosed with pilasters worked in low relief. Behind the woman hangs a mirror in a black frame. The sunlight enters through a window above to the right and illumines the wall and a corner of the mirror. The floor is composed of brown and white tiles. The picture is in a very dirty condition. Its general effect is fine. It is somewhat similar in style to the Weissbach picture (4), but not so charming in subject; it is Canvas, 26 inches by 21 inches. Mentioned by Waagen, Supplement, p. 87, in the collection of the Marquis of Hertford, who bought it from C. Perrier in 1848 (for £283 : 10s.). Described by Bürger, Gazette des Beaux Arts, 1866, vol. xxi. p. 561, as a Vermeer, No. 16. Exhibited at the Royal Academy Winter Exhibition, London, 1893, No. 55. Now in the Wallace collection, London, No. 23 in the 1901 catalogue.

References

External links
Wallace Collection

1663 paintings
Paintings in the Wallace Collection
Paintings by Pieter de Hooch
Paintings of children